Paraguraleus balcombensis is an extinct species of sea snail, a marine gastropod mollusk in the family Mangeliidae.

Description
The length of the shell attains 8.5 mm, its diameter 3.4 mm.

Distribution
This extinct marine species was found in [Middle [Miocene]] strata in Victoria, Australia.

References

 A. W. B. Powell, The Australian Tertiary Mollusca of the Family Turridae, Records of the Auckland Institute and Museum, Vol. 3, No. 1

External links
 

balcombensis
Gastropods described in 1944
Gastropods of Australia